The 20691 / 20692 Tambaram–Nagercoil Antyodaya Express (via Kumbakonam, Thanjavur Jn, Tiruchchirappalli Jn, Madurai Jn) is an express train of the Indian Railways connecting  and  in Tamil Nadu. It is operated daily from Tambaram to Nagercoil Junction as train number 20691, and from Nagercoil Junction to Tambaram as train number 20692.

Announced in 2017, the train started its operations on 9 June 2018 from Tirunelveli Junction and on 10 June 2018 from Tambaram.

Coach composition

Routes & major stops 
  (TBM)
  (CGL)
  (VM)
  (TDPR)
  (CDM)
 (MV)
 (KMU)
 (TJ)
 (TPJ)
 (DG)
 (MDU) 
 (VPT)
 (CVP)
 (TEN)
Valliyur (VLY)
 (NCJ)

Service

20691/Tambaram–Nagercoil Antyodaya Express has an average speed of 59 km/hr and covers 764 km in 13 hrs 50 mins.
20692/Nagercoil–Tambaram Antyodaya Express has an average speed of 55 km/hr and covers 764 km in 14 hrs 00 mins.

See also 
 Kanniyakumari Superfast Express
 Cheran Superfast Express
 Pothigai Superfast Express
 Pallavan Superfast Express
 
 Tiruchirappalli–Thiruvananthapuram Intercity Express

References 

Antyodaya Express trains
Transport in Chennai
Transport in Nagercoil
Rail transport in Tamil Nadu
Railway services introduced in 2018